Max Lang is a film director and illustrator. He has been twice nominated Academy Awards in the category of Best Short Animated Film. In 2011 he received an Oscar nomination for The Gruffalo, and in 2014 he received an Oscar nomination for Room on the Broom.

He is also the director of the Nickelodeon computer-animated TV movie Albert.

Lang illustrates books written by his wife, Suzanne Lang.

Works

Grumpy Monkey

References

External links
 

Living people
American animated film directors
Year of birth missing (living people)
Donaldson and Scheffler